Bhuvanagiri is the name of several places in India:
Bhuvanagiri, Telangana or Bhongir
Bhuvanagiri, Tamil Nadu
Bhuvanagiri, Bangalore, a neighborhood in Bangalore